Hasle railway station could refer to:

 Hasle (station) on the Oslo Metro
 Hasle LU railway station in Hasle, Lucerne, Switzerland